Pachytodes is a genus of beetle belonging to the family Cerambycidae, subfamily Lepturinae (flower longhorns).

Species
Species within this genus include:
 Pachytodes cerambyciformis (Schrank, 1781)
 Pachytodes cometes (Bates, 1884)
 Pachytodes erraticus (Dalman, 1817)
 Pachytodes longipes (Gebler, 1832)
 Pachytodes orthotrichus (Plavilstshikov, 1936)

References 

Lepturinae